Willem de Graaf (born c. 1951) is a former association football player who played as a midfielder. He represented the New Zealand national team at international level.

De Graaf made his full All Whites debut in a 0–0 draw with New Caledonia on 25 July 1969, and he ended his international playing career with 22 A-international caps and seven goals to his credit, his final cap gained in a 0–0 draw with Indonesia on 7 September 1981.

References

External links

1951 births
Year of birth uncertain
Living people
Graaf, Willem de
New Zealand association footballers
Association football midfielders
New Zealand international footballers
1980 Oceania Cup players
National Soccer League (Australia) players
League of Ireland players
Wollongong Wolves FC players
Shelbourne F.C. players
Ringwood City SC players
New Zealand expatriate association footballers
New Zealand expatriate sportspeople in Ireland
Expatriate association footballers in the Republic of Ireland